Ganbare Goemon: Ōedo Daikaiten (がんばれゴエモン〜大江戸大回転〜), is a Goemon game released for the PlayStation on March 29, 2001.

A villain named Ecorori kidnaps Omitsu, and it is up to Goemon and his crew to stop him.

The game is extremely similar to Ganbare Goemon 2 for Super Famicom and Goemon's Great Adventure in that there's mostly side-scrolling levels, accompanied by some Impact bosses and all of its music and sound effects are recycled from the previous games like Mystical Ninja Starring Goemon, Goemon's Great Adventure and Mononoke Suguroku. Unlike previous Goemon games, which have used sprites or 3-D models for the characters, the characters are now represented by pre-rendered CGI, giving them a quasi-3-D look. Also, Yae is featured in her outfit that first appeared in Goemon Mononoke Sugoroku.

References

2001 video games
PlayStation (console) games
PlayStation (console)-only games
Ganbare Goemon games
Now Production games
Japan-exclusive video games
Video games developed in Japan

Cooperative video games
Multiplayer and single-player video games